On 7 December 2022, President of Peru Pedro Castillo attempted to dissolve Congress in the face of imminent impeachment proceedings by the legislative body, immediately enacting a curfew, establishing an emergency government and calling for a constituent assembly. Citing the actions of Congress obstructing many of his policies during his administration, Castillo argued that the legislative body served businesses and used their power to destroy the executive branch.

Castillo was impeached on the same day, and ceased to be president after the Constitutional Court rejected his dissolution of Congress. Castillo's vice president Dina Boluarte was sworn in as the new president later in the day. Following Castillo's removal, his supporters started nationwide protests demanding his release and Boluarte's resignation. Following widespread unrest through Peru, the Boluarte government announced a national state of emergency on 14 December, removing some constitutional protections from citizens, including the rights preventing troops from staying within private homes and buildings, the freedom of movement, the freedom of assembly and "personal freedom and security" for 30 days. Castillo has been placed in "preventive detention" for 18 months and faces trial for rebellion and conspiracy. 

The act was described by several politicians, the Constitutional Court of Peru and Peruvian medias as an attempted coup d'état, with some comparing it to the autogolpe of Alberto Fujimori during the 1992 Peruvian self-coup d'état. Numerous members of Castillo's government resigned from their positions shortly after he announced the dissolution of Congress, and the Peruvian Armed Forces also refused to support his actions. In contrast, some governments of Latin America, including Argentina, Bolivia, Colombia, Honduras and Mexico, responded to the crisis by refusing to recognize the Boluarte government and viewing Castillo as president. Castillo has also continued to consider himself as the legal president of Peru.

Background

Obstructive Congress 
During the presidencies of Ollanta Humala, Pedro Pablo Kuczynski and Martín Vizcarra, the Congress was dominated by the opposition Popular Force, the party created by the daughter of the former Peruvian president Alberto Fujimori, Keiko Fujimori, and opposed many of the actions performed by the presidents. The political legacy of the Fujimori family was assumed by Keiko. President Humala would go on to serve a weak presidency due to constant tension with the Congress.

Constitutional crisis and removal of presidents 

In the Constitution of Peru, the executive branch can dissolve congress after a second vote of no-confidence. Under former president Pedro Pablo Kuczynski, Congress held a no-confidence vote on 15 September 2017, resulting in the collapse of his cabinet, the first vote of no-confidence by the current congressional body. President Kuczynski would later face impeachment in December 2017 and March 2018 due to his admitted involvement with Odebrecht during the Operation Car Wash scandal. Following the release of the Kenjivideos reportedly showing Kuczynski making deals with opposition politicians to avoid impeachment votes, President Kuczynski resigned.

Martín Vizcarra, Kuczynski's first vice president, then assumed office in March 2018. President Vizcarra enacted a constitutional process on 29 May 2019 that would create a motion of no confidence towards Congress if they refused to cooperate with his proposed actions against corruption. For the next four months, Congress delayed bills targeting corruption and postponed general elections proposed by Vizcarra. On 30 September 2019, the President of the Council of Ministers, Salvador del Solar, set forth a vote of confidence before the Congress for refusing to pass a bill that modified the election process of judges of the Constitutional Court. The vote of confidence sought to stop the election of magistrates, modify the Organic Law of the Constitutional Court and the designation of the tribunes. However, the Plenary Session of Congress decided to continue with the election of magistrates, and ignored the vote of confidence presented by Del Solar, naming a new member to the Constitutional Court. Many of the Constitutional Court nominees selected by Congress were alleged to be involved in corruption. Notwithstanding the affirmative vote, Vizcarra stated that the appointment of a new member of the Constitutional Court and an ignoring of the confidence motion constituted a de facto vote of no confidence in the government, which would be the second of the legislative term. These actions by Congress, as well as the months of slow progress towards anti-corruption reforms, pushed Vizcarra to dissolve the legislative body on 30 September, with Vizcarra stating "Peruvian people, we have done all we could." Shortly after Vizcarra announced the dissolution of Congress, the legislative body refused to recognize the president's actions, declared Vizcarra as suspended from the presidency, and named Vice President Mercedes Aráoz as the interim president, moves that were largely seen as null and void. By the night of 30 September, Peruvians gathered outside of the Legislative Palace to protest against Congress and demand the removal of legislators while the heads of the Armed Forces met with Vizcarra, announcing that they still recognized him as president and head of the armed forces. On 14 January 2020, the Constitutional Court ruled that the dissolution of Congress by Vizcarra under the given rationale was legal. Snap legislative elections were held on 26 January, with Keiko Fujimori's Popular Force party losing its majority in Congress and most of its seats.

Months later, amid the COVID-19 pandemic in Peru, President Vizcarra was impeached in September 2020 though not removed, later being controversially removed from office a month later. Thousands of citizens then gathered in protests against Vizcarra's impeachment. Manuel Merino, who succeeded him as president the following day, resigned on 15 November. Francisco Sagasti was made President of Congress on 16 November and thus succeeded Merino as president on 17 November per the presidential line of succession, since both vice presidential positions were vacated by Vizcarra in 2018 and Mercedes Aráoz in May 2020.

Castillo presidency 
Sagasti served as president until Castillo was elected in the 2021 general election, with Keiko Fujimori losing her third consecutive presidential bid. The 2021 election saw many right-wing candidates elected to the congress.

Attempts to remove Castillo 

Multiple attempts to prevent Castillo from entering the office of the presidency or to later remove him occurred, beginning shortly after election results were determined. Following reports of Castillo's apparent victory, Fujimori and her supporters made claims of electoral fraud, leading obstructionist efforts to overturn the election with support of citizens in Lima. Many business groups and politicians refused to recognize Castillo's ascent to the presidency, with those among the more affluent, including former military officers and wealthy families, demanded new elections, promoted calls for a military coup, and used rhetoric to support their allegations of fraud.

Following the 2021 election, audio recordings deemed Vladi-audios were leaked revealing that Vladimiro Montesinos was allegedly involved in at least 17 landline phone calls while imprisoned at the Peruvian Navy's CEREC maximum security prison in an effort to prevent Castillo from entering office and to protect Keiko Fujimori from being imprisoned. In one reported audio, Montesinos mentions a first plan to have Fujimori's husband go to the United States embassy in Lima to present "documentation of the fraud" to the Office of Regional Affairs and Central Intelligence Agency, with Montesinos allegedly saying he already contacted the embassy, that the documents would reach President Joe Biden and that his administration would condemn the election as interference from Cuba, Nicaragua, and Venezuela, subsequently giving Fujimori's claims of fraud more weight. Right-wing politicians in Peru downplayed the audios of Montesinos. According to IDL-Reporteros, the Navy of Peru was involved in a "lie" when issuing their joint statement, saying that Montesinos was only involved in two phone calls, with IDL asking "How could you not notice the 17 calls and 12 conversations at CEREC, at the Naval Base of the institution with the greatest development in electronic intelligence within the Armed Forces?".

In October 2021, the website El Foco released recordings revealing that leaders of the manufacturing employers' organization National Society of Industries, the leader of the Union of Multimodal Transport Guilds of Peru (UGTRANM), Geovani Rafael Diez Villegas, political leaders, and other business executives planned various actions, including funding transportation strikes in November 2021, to destabilize the Castillo government and prompt his removal. Far-right groups of former soldiers also allied with political parties like Go on Country – Social Integration Party, Popular Force, and Popular Renewal in an effort to remove Castillo, with some veteran leaders seen directly with Rafael López Aliaga and Castillo's former presidential challenger Keiko Fujimori, who signed the Madrid Charter promoted by the Spanish far-right political party Vox. These groups directed threats towards Castillo government officials and journalists, whilst also calling for a coup d'état and insurgency.

Impeachment attempts

From the beginning of his presidency, Castillo was targeted by Congress, dominated by the opposition right-wing parties, whom made it clear that they wanted to remove him from office by impeachment. Due to broadly interpreted impeachment wording in the Constitution of Peru (1993), Congress can impeach the president on the vague grounds of "moral incapacity", effectively making the legislature more powerful than the executive branch. 

In November 2021, four months into Castillo's term, Fujimori announced that her party was pushing forward impeachment proceedings, arguing that Castillo was "morally unfit for office". On 25 November 28 legislators from Fujimori's party presented a signed motion of impeachment to Congress, setting up a vote for opening impeachment proceedings. The impeachment proceeding did not occur, as 76 voted against proceedings, 46 were in favor, and 4 abstained, with the requirement of 52 favoring proceedings not met. 

In February 2022, it was reported that Fujimorists and politicians close to Fujimori organized a meeting at the Casa Andina hotel in Lima with the assistance of the German liberal group Friedrich Naumann Foundation, with those present including President of Congress Maricarmen Alva, at which plans to remove Castillo from office were discussed. Alva had already shared her readiness to assume the presidency if Castillo were to be vacated from the position and a leaked Telegram group chat of the board of directors of Congress that she heads revealed plans coordinated to oust Castillo. 

A second impeachment attempt related to corruption allegations did make it to proceedings in March 2022. On 28 March 2022, Castillo appeared before Congress calling the allegations baseless and for legislators to "vote for democracy" and "against instability", with 55 voting for impeachment, 54 voting against, and 19 abstaining, thus failing to reach the 87 votes necessary.

Public approval of Castillo steadily declined to a record low 20% approval, as his presidency progressed and protests occurred in early 2022 as a result of increasing prices with crises surrounding the president arising steadily. By December 2022, Congress had begun motions to attempt the impeachment of Castillo for a third time; he was involved with six different criminal investigations and had already named five separate cabinets to serve under him.

Attempts to remove Boluarte 
For months, opposition politicians attempted to disqualify Boluarte in an effort to assume the presidency upon her removal. On 5 December 2022, just days before Congress was set to vote on impeaching Castillo, a constitutional complaint was filed by the Subcommittee on Constitutional Accusations against Vice President Dina Boluarte, alleging that she operated a private club while she was the Minister of Development. The allegations against Boluarte created the potential for the vice president to face controversy if Castillo were to be impeached.

Military involvement 
In the day before the attempt to dissolve Congress, Chief of the Joint Command General Manuel Gómez de la Torre held a meeting with the branch heads of the armed forces of Peru.

Timeline of events

Preparations for impeachment 
In the weeks before the third impeachment, the media in Peru launched a smear campaign of unsubstantiated claims against President Castillo according to Le Monde diplomatique, with the Latin American Strategic Center for Geopolitics (CELAG) finding that 79% of media articles about Castillo being "negative". On 6 December, it was likely that Congress did not have 87 votes to remove President Castillo from office. President Castillo's attorney, Benji Espinoza, spent the day with the president discussing how to respond to the situation, later stating that during the six hours she spent with him "at no time was the issue of the dissolution of Congress addressed". That same day, Chief of the Joint Command General Manuel Gómez de la Torre held a meeting with the branch heads of the armed forces of Peru. During the meeting, General Gómez de la Torre warned the branch heads of a pending conflict, stating "I am responsible. There are no other orders". Commanding general of the Army of Peru, Wálter Córdova, also submitted his resignation on 6 December, with the submission being approved the next morning.

Dissolution of Congress
On 7 December 2022, Congress was expected to file a motion of censure against Castillo, accusing him of "permanent moral incapacity". Before the legislative body could gather to file its motion, Castillo announced the dissolution of Congress and enacted an immediate curfew. In his speech, Castillo stated:

He then called on individuals possessing illegal weapons to deliver them to the National Police within 72 hours and ordered all troops of the Peruvian Army to remain at their barracks, saying that he did not want clashes between citizens and the military.

Castillo would later explain his actions, saying that he never attempted to subvert Peru's democracy and only sought "to get closer to the people", stating "I took the flag of the Constituent People's Assembly and gave my speech remembering and being faithful to the people who voted for me, who trusted me. ... I wanted to make the political class understand that popular power is the maximum expression of societies. I didn't want to obey the social economic power groups. I wanted to put the people above all else. ... It was my decision. No one else's. I was nervous, but I did it." He would also say that his ministers were unaware of his announcement.

Reactions
The media in Peru did not report the substance of Castillo's statements, including the rationale for his actions, instead stating that he was attempting a coup. Moments after Castillo's speech, multiple ministers resigned from his government, including Prime Minister Betssy Chávez, Minister of Labor , Minister of the Economy Kurt Burneo, Minister of Foreign Relations César Landa and Minister of Justice . Peru's permanent representatives to the United Nations and to the Organization of American States, Manuel Rodríguez Cuadros and Harold Forsyth, also tendered their resignations. The attorney representing Castillo dropped him as a client, stating: "As a lawyer respectful of the Constitution, I assumed the defense of the President of the Republic presuming his innocence. Since there has been a breach of the constitutional order, I am obliged to irrevocably renounce the defense of citizen Pedro Castillo."

The Constitutional Court released a statement: "No one owes obedience to a usurping government and Mr. Pedro Castillo has made an ineffective coup d'état. The Armed Forces are empowered to restore the constitutional order." The Armed Forces also issued a statement rejecting Castillo's actions and calling for the maintenance of stability in Peru.

Resolution
Rejecting Castillo's actions to dissolve the legislative body, Congress gathered and voted to remove Castillo from office due to "moral incapacity" with 101 votes in favor, 6 against and 10 abstentions. It was announced that First Vice President Dina Boluarte, who rejected Castillo's actions, would take her oath of office for the presidency at 3:00 pm PET.

President Castillo then fled the Government Palace and contacted president of Mexico Andrés Manuel López Obrador, raising concerns about political asylum. According to President López Obrador, it was likely that Castillo's phone was tapped by Peruvian intelligence, with the Mexican president reporting that Peruvian authorities entered the grounds of the Mexican embassy to prevent Castillo from entering. Castillo said that he did not seek to leave Peru and only wanted to drop his family off at the Mexican embassy for their safety. Upon learning that Castillo was seeking to enter the Mexican embassy, the general of the PNP learned that his officers were the drivers for Castillo and ordered them to deliver Castillo to the Prefecture where he would be arrested. Individuals gathered outside the Mexican embassy in Lima to block the area upon rumors that Castillo was attempting to flee to seek asylum in Mexico. The PNP officers driving Castillo said that they had to make an emergency detour, later bringing him to the Prefecture where he was greeted by the head of the PNP, who arrested him, in flagrante delicto, for rebellion.

Castillo's vice president Dina Boluarte entered the Legislative Palace shortly after 3:00 pm PET and appeared before Congress, where she was later sworn in as president of Peru. Following Castillo's removal, his supporters started nationwide protests demanding his release and Boluarte's resignation.

Aftermath 

While Castillo was detained, he denounced a "Machiavellian plan" against him by the National Prosecutor Patricia Benavides, Congress and his former vice president Boluarte. Some Latin American media organizations linked the events to United States Ambassador to Peru Lisa D. Kenna, a former member of the Central Intelligence Agency. Ambassador Kenna had met with Castillo's defense minister, Gustavo Bobbio, the day before the impeachment vote, raising concerns about the United States being involved in the events. Local media also reported that the President of Congress and former head of the Peruvian armed forces, José Williams, allegedly collaborated with Ambassador Kenna.

IDL-Reporteros reported that the right-wing Congress' approval of President Boluarte was weak since they had previously attempted to disqualify her as well. President Boluarte immediately installed the right-wing leader Pedro Angulo Arana as prime minister. According to La República and Voice of America, the U.S. Prime Minister Angulo faces multiple controversies and is involved in 13 criminal investigations, with serious allegations including sexual harassment of women assistants and supporting the actions of César Hinostroza, who illegally asked for favors from magistrate María Apaza and fled from Peru.

Supporters of Castillo were angered at the actions against the former president, demanding immediate general elections and staging nationwide protests. Protests erupted in violence on 11 December near the southern city of Andahuaylas where demonstrators closed the airport, with police in a helicopter reportedly firing upon protesters, killing two individuals. President Boluarte attempted to appease protests by proposing elections two years early, for April 2024, though Castillo supporters rejected the call while Castillo described such actions as a "dirty game". Congress would reject Boluarte's proposal for early elections. However, congress reconsidered the proposal on 21 December and allowed early elections.

Public opinion 
In an IEP poll following Castillo's attempt to dissolve Congress, of respondents, 44% approved of Castillo's actions, 53% disapproved and 3% had no opinion or comment, with the majority of support for Castillo's actions being among rural and lower class Peruvians.

International reactions

Recognition

International recognition of Boluarte's government has been mixed.

Members of the São Paulo Forum like Luiz Inácio Lula da Silva of Brazil and Gabriel Boric of Chile recognize Boluarte. The United States has recognized Boluarte as president. Spain was also in support, championing a return to "constitutional order."

Latin American governments, including Argentina, Bolivia, Colombia, Honduras, Mexico and Venezuela have continued to recognize that Pedro Castillo is the democratically elected President of Peru following the events in December 2022 and refused to recognize Boluarte. Left-wing Latin American leaders such as Nicolás Maduro of Venezuela, Andrés Manuel López Obrador of Mexico, Gustavo Petro of Colombia, Alberto Fernández of Argentina, and Luis Arce of Bolivia denounced Boluarte's government as a right wing coup, comparing the situation as similar to ascension of Bolivia's Jeanine Áñez during the 2019 Bolivian political crisis. The latter presidents continue to support Pedro Castillo's claims he is the rightful president under a "government of exception."

Statements 
The regional countries of Mexico, Bolivia, Colombia and Argentina issued a joint statement recording their view that Castillo is "a victim of undemocratic harassment" and pleaded for maintaining his human and legal rights.
 : The Ministry of Foreign Affairs and Worship expressed "deep concern" over the situation in Peru and made a call on "every Peruvian politician" to "protect democratic institutions, the rule of law and constitutional order".
 : President Luis Arce condemned the "elite harassment" against "popular governments" after the crisis in Peru, stating that "since the beginning, the Peruvian right tried to overthrow a government democratically elected by the people, by the humble classes that seeked more inclusion and social justice". He also sent his solidarity to "the sister Republic of Peru", criticizing the "constant harassment of anti-democratic elites against progressive, popular and legitimately constituted governments", and asked that "everyone" condemn this situation.
 : The Ministry of Foreign Affairs classified Castillo's actions as incompatible with the constitutional framework of Peru, representing a violation of democracy and the rule of law. The ministry wished success to Boluarte. The President-elect, Luiz Inácio Lula da Silva, stated that the removal of Castillo was "constitutional" and expressed his hope that President Boluarte succeeds in "her task of reconciling the country and leading it on the path of development and social peace."
 : The government issued a statement which said that it "deeply regrets the political situation that the Republic of Peru is experiencing, and trusts that this crisis that affects a sister country can be resolved through democratic mechanisms and respect for the rule of law".
 : President Gustavo Petro said that Castillo "allowed himself to be led to political suicide" and that "he was wrong" in wanting to dissolve Congress. He also stressed, however, that "anti-democracy cannot be fought with anti-democracy."
 : The Foreign Ministry issued a statement expressing "its deep concern about the political situation in the sister country of Peru" and calling "on all political actors to maintain the rule of law and democracy and on the international community to facilitate the democratic process in Peru".
 : The Foreign Ministry called what happened to Castillo, a coup d'état against him. It published a statement communicating its "energetic condemnation of the coup d'état that occurred in Peru, which is the result of a series of events to erode democracy and the sovereign will of the people represented by President Pedro Castillo." Honduras also demanded that Castillo's "physical integrity and human rights be respected," adding, "The government of Honduras hopes that the democratic order and electoral sovereignty of Peru retake the rule of law and guarantees its rights, amid this grave constitutional violation."
 : On 7 December, Mexican Foreign Affairs Secretary Marcelo Ebrard stated that he regretted the developments, and called for democracy to be respected. The President of Mexico Andrés Manuel López Obrador commented that "because of the interests of economic and political elites, since the beginning of the legitimate presidency of Pedro Castillo, an environment of confrontation and hostility was maintained against him, leading him to take decisions that have served his adversaries to remove him." During his morning press conference on 8 December, President López Obrador revealed he had received a call on Wednesday in which Castillo informed him of his intention to seek political asylum at the Mexican embassy. President López Obrador also stated that Mexico did not yet recognize the government of Dina Boluarte, saying that the position of Mexico would be determined in the following days. Later in the day on 8 December, Ebrard stated via Twitter that the Mexican Ambassador to Peru had met with Castillo after his arrest and that the embassy had received a letter from Castillo's lawyer officially requesting asylum. Peru declared Mexico's ambassador to Lima "persona non grata" and ordered him to leave the country on 21 December.
 : The government expressed "its concern about the situation in Peru", and called for a "constructive dialogue between all the actors and political forces to preserve democracy and its institutions in favor of stability and pacification in that sister country."
 : The Ministry of Foreign Affairs said that their government "firmly condemns the breakdown of the constitutional order in Peru and welcomes the restoration of democratic normality", stating that Spain "will always be on the side of democracy and the defense of constitutional legality." A day later, Prime Minister Pedro Sánchez announced that he had talked with Dina Boluarte and expressed to her "Spain's support in defending the Constitution and the Rule of Law".
 : The government rejected Castillo's actions. U.S. ambassador to Peru Lisa D. Kenna stated, "The United States categorically rejects any extraconstitutional act by President Castillo to prevent Congress from fulfilling its mandate. The United States strongly urges President Castillo to reverse his attempt to shut down Congress and allow Peru's democratic institutions to function according to the Constitution. We encourage the Peruvian public to remain calm during this uncertain time."
 : The government made "a call to respect democratic institutions and strongly condemns any attempt to break the current constitutional order." It also hoped that the swearing in of Dina Boluarte "will lead to guaranteeing political stability and the preservation of the rule of law".
 : President Nicolás Maduro stated that although his country does not interfere in the internal affairs of any country, he hoped that the Peruvian people, within the framework of their Constitution, will soon achieve "their path to liberation, democracy and happiness" while claiming that "they elect a teacher as president, [Pedro Castillo], and from the first moment of the election they do not want to recognize his victory, in the end forced by reality they have to recognize his victory as president, and once he is sworn in the conspiracy for a parliamentary coup begins".

See also
2019–2020 Peruvian constitutional crisis, where President Martín Vizcarra dissolved Congress and called for snap elections
1992 Peruvian self-coup, perpetrated by President Alberto Fujimori

References

Self-coup d'état attempt
Peru
Peru
Peru
Political controversies
Political history of Peru
Attempted coups d'état in Peru